Jagdish Gupt (1924–2001) was a well-known poet of the Nayi kavita (नई कविता) generation, a period of Modernism in modern Indian Hindi poetry. He was chairman of the Department of Hindi at Allahabad University.
 

Jagdish Gupta was born in Shahabad, Hardoi district.  He earned an MA and D.Phil.  He worked as a chairman of the Hindi Department in Allahabad University and engaged in freelance writing.  Gupta was a noble poet, literature writer and critic.  He was a noted Indian poet of the Nayi Kavita literary movement of the early 20th century.  His main Poetry – Collection: "Nav ke panv, Aditya Ekant, Him Vidh, Shabd Dansh, Shambuk and Yugm."  He did his thesis on Gujrati and Brajbhasha.  He had a special interest in painting.  He was honored by the government of the Braj sahatiya mandal of Madhya Pradesh and Uttar Pradesh.

References

1924 births
2001 deaths
Hindi-language poets
People from Hardoi
Academic staff of the University of Allahabad
20th-century Indian poets
Indian male poets
Poets from Uttar Pradesh
20th-century Indian male writers